Park Jong-ryong (born 12 February, 1962) is a South Korean diver. He competed in the men's 10 metre platform event at the 1984 Summer Olympics.

References

1962 births
Living people
South Korean male divers
Olympic divers of South Korea
Divers at the 1984 Summer Olympics
Place of birth missing (living people)
20th-century South Korean people